The November 26 – December 3, 2019 North American blizzard was a major winter storm from the Rocky Mountains to the Northeast as well as a record-breaking windstorm along the West Coast (particularly California and Oregon). It occurred the week of American Thanksgiving, hampering travel for millions across the United States.

From November 27–30, the low merged with the subtropical jet as it tracked slowly eastward across the Rockies, Plains and Midwest. The combination of cold air, moisture and high winds produced a wide swath of blizzard conditions from Colorado through western South Dakota, including the Denver area. In Rapid City,  of snow fell on the 30th, breaking the one-day snowfall record for November. In Duluth, it was the city's heaviest snowstorm in ten years. As the first major winter storm of the season in the northeast, it dumped  of snow in Albany, where it was the heaviest snowfall since the 1993 Superstorm. The storm finally moved out to sea December 3. The Storm Was Unofficially Named Winter Storm Ezekiel by the Weather Channel.

Meteorological history 
It was unofficially given the name Winter Storm Ezekiel by The Weather Channel. Over the following three days it merged with the subtropical jet stream as it trekked slowly eastward over the Rockies, High Plains and Midwest. On December 1–2, the storm entered the Northeast as the first major winter storm of the season, before moving out to sea by December 3.

Impacts

Southwest

While southern Oregon and Northern California received wind gusts exceeding 100 mph (160 km/h), Southern California and Arizona experienced widespread heavy rain, severe thunderstorms and flash flooding. Following the recent drought and wildfires, the ground had reduced ability to absorb rainwater and so the NWS warned of the possibility of flash floods and debris flows. Flash floods with up to two feet of standing water occurred in San Diego. Hail fell in Grotela in association with a heavier burst of rain (likely a thunderstorm) that moved through the area. Freezing levels fell below , meaning that high elevation suburbs of Los Angeles like Palmdale and Victorville received accumulating snow. The snow was disruptive to Thanksgiving travelers, as it weighed down and snapped tree limbs and closed I-5 at Parker Road and the Grapevine. Over a foot of snow fell in the mountains of northern Arizona and several tornado warnings for issued for the central portion of the state, and 4 tornadoes touched down at night, causing $245,000 in damage in the suburbs of Phoenix. This became the latest in the year multiple tornadoes touched down in Maricopa County. A flooded Tonto Creek swept away a vehicle containing three children.

Rocky Mountains and High Plains
Denver saw an unusually snowy November partially thanks to this storm alone. It dumped nearly twice the average monthly snowfall total on the city. In the central and northern Plains freezing drizzle fell on Thanksgiving Day and Black Friday, transitioning to snow, and then heavy snow, overnight. On the following day, November 30, winds increased, gusting from 45 to 60 mph at times, creating blizzard conditions. In Rapid City, South Dakota,  of snow fell, of which  fell in just one day, breaking the one-day and two-day November snowfall records respectively. In the northern Black Hills, a local mountain range, over two feet of snow fell. One person was killed in a rollover crash near Cavour. The individual, as well as their passenger, were not wearing seatbelts. A crash on I-15 near Willard, Utah, also killed one person.

Midwest
In Duluth, Minnesota,  of snow fell at the airport, where wind gusts frequently exceeded , meeting blizzard criteria. The snowfall accumulation was the ninth-heaviest on record and the most in ten years. Near Patton, Missouri, two boys, ages 5 and 8, and the vehicle they were riding in, were swept away. In this incident, a 33 year old man and a 2 year old infant suffered injuries but survived. A 48-year-old man died in a separate incident near Sedgewickville, Missouri.

Northeast and Mid-Atlantic
In Albany,  of snow fell, making the storm the eighth and fourth-worst overall and for December, respectively, and the most intense since the 1993 Superstorm. Seven New York counties placed on a 'State of emergency' and Boston public schools closed in the storm's aftermath, although school boards closed in a dozen counties from North Carolina to Maine. In the New York Metropolitan Area, 80,000 lost power and 370 flights were cancelled. Pennsylvania transportation officials reduced the speed limit to 45 mph on I-80, I-81, I-84, I-476 and I-380. Several other states also put either travel restrictions or speed-limit reductions into effect. Snowfall closed portions of the Blue Ridge Parkway and US 441 in North Carolina and Virginia. I-86 near Elmira temporarily closed. In addition to road issues, hundreds of flights were cancelled and thousands were delayed.

Snowfall totals 
From the storm's landfall in California to its exit from the Northeast, it produced snowfall in at least 30 states:

See also 

 January 2010 North American winter storms
 Tornado outbreak of December 16–17, 2019

Notes

References 

2019-11
2019 in the United States
2019 natural disasters in the United States